Acacia leichhardtii, commonly known as Leichhardt's wattle, is a shrub of the genus Acacia and the subgenus Phyllodineae that is endemic to north eastern Australia.

Description
It has slender branches that usually arch downwards and branchlets that are covered in soft hairs. It has small grey-green patent to reflexed phyllodes that have a narrowly oblong-elliptic to lanceolate shape. The simple sweet smelling inflorescences occur in bunches of 12 to 20 and have spherical flower-heads containing 20 to 40 bright golden flowers.

Taxonomy
The species was first formally described by the botanist George Bentham in 1864 in the work Flora Australiensis. It was reclassified by Leslie Pedley in 1987 as Racosperma leichhardtii then returned to genus Acacia in 2001.

Distribution
It is native to an area of Queensland from the Central Highlands Region on the Blackdown Tablelands in the north to around Toowoomba in the south east on the Darling Downs growing on sandstone ranges in shallow stony sandy soils as a part of open Eucalyptus woodland communities.

See also
 List of Acacia species

References

leichhardtii
Flora of Queensland
Plants described in 1864
Taxa named by George Bentham